James McConnell was an English professional footballer who played as a goalkeeper. He played for Padiham before joining Burnley in August 1886. He played first competitive match for Burnley on 23 October 1886 in the 3–3 draw away at Astley Bridge in the first round of the FA Cup. McConnell played four further FA Cup ties for Burnley, but by the time the Football League commenced in September 1888, he had been replaced by William Smith as the first-choice goalkeeper. He eventually made his league debut for the club on 11 January 1890 in the 1–3 loss to Stoke at Turf Moor. McConnell left Burnley in the summer of 1890 and subsequently signed for Brierfield.

References

Year of birth missing
Year of death missing
English footballers
Association football goalkeepers
Padiham F.C. players
Burnley F.C. players
English Football League players